rampur bangar is a village in the Gautam Budh Nagar district

References
http://wikimapia.org/203135/Rampur-bangar

Villages in Gautam Buddh Nagar district